Willy Fossli (8 July 1931 – 29 January 2017) was a Norwegian footballer who played for Asker and the Norwegian national team as a striker. In the 1955–56 Hovedserien season, Fossli scored 17 goals and became the league's top scorer and the only player from Asker to have made the achievement. He was capped six times for the Norwegian national team.

Honours
Individual
Norwegian top division top scorer: 1955–56

References

1931 births
2017 deaths
Norwegian footballers
Norway international footballers
Asker Fotball players
Eliteserien players
Norwegian First Division players
Association football forwards